Bukovyna Stadium is a multi-use stadium in Chernivtsi, Ukraine. It is currently used mostly for football matches, and is the home of FC Bukovyna Chernivtsi. The stadium holds 12,000 spectators.

In 1989, at the stadium was held the Chervona Ruta youth festival of Ukrainian contemporary music.

External links
Stadium information

Football venues in Ukraine
Buildings and structures in Chernivtsi
Sports venues in Chernivtsi Oblast